Jeroen van Damme (born September 29, 1972 in Roosendaal, North Brabant) is a Dutch long distance track, and road running athlete.

On April 10, 2005 Van Damme finished the Rotterdam Marathon in 2:13:48, qualifying for the 2005 World Championships in Athletics where he finished in 58th position.

Van Damme finished second in the St. Bavoloop on June 17, 2007 in Rijsbergen.

External links

 Hardloopkrant.nl profile
 article about Jeroen van Damme

1972 births
Living people
Dutch male long-distance runners
Dutch male marathon runners
Sportspeople from Roosendaal
World Athletics Championships athletes for the Netherlands
21st-century Dutch people